Opry Mills is a super-regional shopping mall in Nashville, Tennessee, United States. The mall was owned by the Mills Corporation and Ryman Hospitality Properties until 2007, when the Mills Corporation was acquired by Simon Property Group. It opened on May 12, 2000 on the former site of Opryland Themepark. The mall is adjacent to the Grand Ole Opry House and the Gaylord Opryland Resort & Convention Center. The anchor stores are Regal Cinemas, Madame Tussauds, Sun & Ski Sports, Off Broadway Shoe Warehouse, Bass Pro Shops, Ralph Lauren, Nike Outlet, H&M, Old Navy, Forever 21, and Dave & Buster's.

Description
Opry Mills is a single-level mall that contained over 178 stores, including F.Y.E., GameStop, LEGO Store, Bass Pro Shops Outdoor World, Polo Ralph Lauren Factory Store, Forever 21, Gap Factory Store, H&M, IMAX, Madame Tussauds, Nike Factory Store, Movado Company Store, Off Broadway Shoe Warehouse, Old Navy Outlet Store, Regal Cinemas, and Sun and Ski Sports. There is also a large food court that contains Popeyes, Subway, Panda Express, Chili's, T.G.I. Friday's, Burger King, Villa Fresh Italian Kitchen, Johnny Rockets, The Cheesecake Factory, Rainforest Cafe, Dave & Buster's, Saltgrass Steakhouse, Aquarium Restaurant, Bavarian Bierhaus, Chuy's Mexican Food and Romano's Macaroni Grill restaurants are located inside and outside the food court.

The General Jackson showboat,  which operates on the Cumberland River, is docked just outside Opry Mills.

History
The current site of Opry Mills was originally Opryland Themepark, a popular theme park which operated from 1972 to 1997. In November 1997, Gaylord Entertainment announced their partnership with the Mills Corporation to construct the Opry Mills shopping mall on the site of the theme park. Opryland closed in December of that year. The mall opened on May 12, 2000. After struggling with bankruptcy for many years, the Mills Corporation was purchased by Simon Property Group in 2007, taking over operations of Opry Mills.
 
Opry Mills temporarily closed in May 2010 after the water from the 2010 Tennessee floods reached as high as 10 feet inside the mall. The entire property was remediated. In September 2010, restoration work was halted while litigation over insurance claims played out in court, and many of the mall's retailers sought locations elsewhere in the area, either permanently or until the mall was restored and reopened. The initial reopening date was set for August 2011, but that self-imposed deadline was not met due to the litigation. There was speculation that Simon Malls might not reopen the mall at all, due to the company's decision to stop renovations to the mall during litigation. Simon Malls denied that it had plans to close the mall temporarily.

On April 12, 2011, mall officials announced that a financing deal had been reached to resume reconstruction of Opry Mills, and the mall reopened on March 29, 2012, after two years of repairs, with some of the anchor retailers opening sooner. The property was given a facelift during the remediation, and featured a new logo upon its reopening.

The mall owners had been awarded $200 million in insurance coverage from the flood, but in 2018 the Tennessee Supreme Court let stand a lower court's ruling that stripped $150 million of that coverage, as the mall had been built in a known flood zone.

References

External links
Official Website

IMAX venues
Economy of Nashville, Tennessee
Shopping malls in Tennessee
Grand Ole Opry
Shopping malls established in 2000
Simon Property Group
Outlet malls in the United States
Tourist attractions in Nashville, Tennessee
Buildings and structures in Nashville, Tennessee
2000 establishments in Tennessee